The Stone's Lament is a Big Finish Productions audio drama featuring Lisa Bowerman as Bernice Summerfield, a character from the spin-off media based on the long-running British science fiction television series Doctor Who.

Plot 
Reclusive billionaire, Bratheen Traloor, has invited Bernice to examine a mysterious artefact but is there another reason for his interest in the archaeologist?

Cast
Bernice Summerfield - Lisa Bowerman
Adrian Wall - Harry Myers
Bratheen Tralor - James Lailey

External links
Big Finish Productions - Professor Bernice Summerfield: The Stone's Lament

Bernice Summerfield audio plays
Fiction set in the 27th century